Aulacodes bipunctalis is a species of moth of the family Crambidae described by George Hamilton Kenrick in 1907. It is found in Papua New Guinea.

It has a wingspan of 23 mm.

References

Acentropinae
Moths of New Guinea